Bouchra Ijork (born 1976 in Casablanca) is a Moroccan filmmaker, screenwriter, dramatist and actress. She studied dramatic arts in Morocco, graduating from the ISADAC in 1998. She then had a brief stint playing a few roles in theater and television before she went to France and studied at La Fémis.

Works

Filmography (as director)

Television films 

 2007: The Bitter Orange 
 2004: Al Bahja

Short films 

 2004: Karawane, The Lebanese Bird

Theater 

 1996: Parlons de la mort
 1998: Le pain nu

References 

1976 births
Living people